is an action arcade video game developed and published in Japan by Namco in 1985. It is a sequel to 1982's Dig Dug. Pookas and fire-breathing Fygars return as the enemies, but the side view tunneling of the original is replaced with an overhead view of an island maze.

Gameplay

Dig Dug II takes place on an island with an overhead view. The goal is to kill all the enemies. There are two types of enemies: Pookas (round red monsters with goggles), which can kill a player by touching him, and Fygars (dragons), which can kill a player either by touching him or breathing fire on him.

Taizo Hori (the player's character) is armed with two weapons. One is an air pump that can inflate enemies until they burst. The other is a jackhammer, which can be used at "fault lines" on the map to create faults in the ground. If both ends of a system of faults reach the water, the ground surrounded by them will sink into the ocean, killing all creatures on it, including Taizo himself if the player is not careful. The points earned from this depend on how many enemies are killed at once. Once three pieces of land have been cut off an island, a bonus vegetable will appear somewhere on what remains of the island, which can be eaten for extra points. When only one, two or (on later rounds) three enemies remain on the island, the enemies will head for the edge of the island and jump into the water, killing themselves and ending the round.

Reception

Dig Dug II saw some success in its first few months on the market, but the game was largely unsuccessful and not nearly as popular as its predecessor. A reviewer for the magazine Computer & Video Games said that, while having a high difficulty level, it was worth playing and became easier through practice.

In retrospective analysis, the games's departure from the original's maze-chase gameplay, its time of release, and the lack of the original's free movement are believed to have contributed to its failure.

Legacy
Dig Dug II was ported to the Famicom in Japan in 1986, followed by a 1989 release for the Nintendo Entertainment System in North America (with the subtitle Trouble in Paradise added to the packaging, but not to the game itself), and then in 1990 by a release for the Famicom Disk System in Japan. Until 2005, the game was seen exclusively on the NES in North America.

In 2005, Dig Dug II was ported to the PlayStation Portable as part of Namco Museum Battle Collection, and was included in Namco Museum DS which was released for the Nintendo DS on September 18, 2007. The game was also included in Namco Museum Virtual Arcade in 2008 and was released on the Wii Virtual Console in Japan on October 20, 2009, along with the inceptive title. Both Dig Dug games are available as part of the Namco Museum Megamix compilation for the Wii, which (much unlike the Virtual Console Arcade versions) was only released in North America.

A reimagined version for Microsoft Windows titled Dig Dug Island, featuring online multiplayer, was released in 2008 exclusively in Japan. However, the game's servers were shut down in just under a year, leaving it unplayable.

References

Notes

External links

1985 video games
Arcade video games
Namco arcade games
Nintendo Entertainment System games
Famicom Disk System games
X68000 games
Top-down video games
Video game sequels
Video games developed in Japan
Video games scored by Yuriko Keino
Virtual Console games
Virtual Console games for Wii U
Multiplayer and single-player video games
Nintendo Switch Online games